Madeleine Laferrière (1847 – 1912) was a French designer, best remembered for her fashion house Maison Laferrière in Paris, and for designing dresses for Queen Alexandra of Great Britain and Queen Maud of Norway.

References 

1847 births
1912 deaths
French fashion designers
French women fashion designers